This is a family tree of Chinese monarchs during the Warring States period.

Warring States period

In 771 BC, a coalition of feudal lords and the Western Rong tribes overthrew King You and drove the Zhou out of the Wei valley. During the following Spring and Autumn and Warring States periods, the major states pursued independent policies and eventually declared full independence claiming the title  borne by Zhou rulers.
All claimed descent from the Yellow Emperor through cadet lines of the royal houses above, although the historicity of such claims is usually doubted.

Qin 

The kings of Qin claimed descent from the Lady Xiu, "the granddaughter" of "a remote descendant" of the Emperor Zhuanxu, the grandson of the Yellow Emperor. Similarly, in the next generation, Lady Hua was said to be descended from Shaodian, the legendary figure who is sometimes the father and sometimes the foster father of the Yellow and Flame Emperors. Although Nüfang (lit. "Lady Fang") is counted as Elai's son, some scholars have claimed the figure was Elai's daughter and, along with the numerous important women in the early pedigree, indicates that early Qin was matriarchal.
The surname Ying (lit."Abundance") was said to have been bestowed by Shun upon Dafei (the husbandman Yi). If it was ever held by any of his descendants, it had fallen out of use by the time of Feizi, who was granted the name anew by King Xiao of the Zhou.

The Three Jins

Han

Wei

Zhao

Qi

House of Jiang

House of Tian

Chu

Yue

Yan

Notes

References 

Chinese monarchs
Dynasty genealogy